Thomas Joseph Tupa Jr. (born February 6, 1966) is a former American football punter and quarterback in the National Football League.

Personal life and high school career
As a child, Tupa participated in the NFL's Punt, Pass, and Kick contest, and was a semi-finalist three times, winning once. Tupa played mostly quarterback at Brecksville-Broadview Heights High School; he led his team to the state championship while also lettering in basketball (where he averaged 20.8 points per game) and baseball (where he was a pitcher and shortstop).  While in high school, Tupa played on the same basketball team as former NBA head coach Eric Musselman and former NBA forward Scott Roth.

After sitting three seasons behind Mike Tomczak and Jim Karsatos, Tupa took over the starting quarterback job at Ohio State University in 1987, throwing for 2,252 yards, 15 touchdowns and 12 interceptions. He was selected as an All-American punter in the same season, as well as All-Big 10. Tupa was a four-time football letterman and was also selected to play in the 1988 Hula Bowl all-star game.

Tupa is currently the offensive coordinator at his high school alma mater, Brecksville-Broadview Heights High School, where he called the plays for both his sons.  He is also Brecksville's Recreation Director.

His son Tom Tupa III (high school class of 2013) was a quarterback for Miami University in Oxford, Ohio. His son Tim Tupa (high school class of 2014) played wide receiver for the Bowling Green State University.
His son Tyler Tupa (high school class of 2016) formerly played wide receiver for Ohio University.

He is a first cousin of former Colorado Democratic State Senator and Majority Caucus Leader Ron Tupa.

Professional career
Tupa was drafted in the third round (68th overall) of the 1988 NFL Draft by the Phoenix Cardinals. His second season with the team saw an expanded role after. He started two games at quarterback, while registering six punts for 46.7 yards per punt. After spending the entire 1990 season as strictly a holder on kicks, he was the primary quarterback for the Cardinals the following year, playing in 11 games and throwing six touchdowns to 13 interceptions. He then joined the Indianapolis Colts in 1992, playing as a backup quarterback to Jack Trudeau and Jeff George.

That season also marked the last time Tupa was used regularly as a quarterback; after that he almost exclusively punted, with only emergency occasions or trick plays making use of his throwing skills. Tupa did not play in the 1993 NFL season, having been cut by the Cleveland Browns right before the season and later re-signed as a backup in November following an injury to starting quarterback Vinny Testaverde and the release of backup Bernie Kosar. He was retained by the Browns the following year and stayed with them for two seasons as their starting punter. With the Browns, Tupa scored the first two-point conversion in NFL history, running in a faked extra point kick attempt for the Browns in a game against the Cincinnati Bengals in the first week of the 1994 season. He scored a total of three such conversions that season, earning him the nickname "Two Point Tupa."

Tupa joined the New England Patriots in 1996 and played for them for three years. During his Patriots tenure, he played in Super Bowl XXXI, in which the Patriots lost to the Green Bay Packers. He would be named the Patriots' All-1990s Team.

In 1999, Tupa signed with the New York Jets. It was during this season that Tupa received his first invitation to the Pro Bowl. He also made his first pass attempt since 1996, and went 6-of-11 for 165 yards and two touchdowns during the Jets' week one matchup against his former team, the Patriots. Tupa was put in at quarterback in the first quarter after Vinny Testaverde tore his achilles tendon. Despite his success, the Jets lost the game to the Patriots. He remained with the Jets through the 2001 season.

2002 saw Tupa sign with the Tampa Bay Buccaneers, where he was their punter on their road to Super Bowl XXXVII, where they defeated the Oakland Raiders. Before the start of the 2004 NFL season, Tupa signed with the Washington Redskins. In 2004, he was named as a Pro Bowl second alternate. He spent 2005 on the injured reserve list, and did not appear in a game.

The final pass of Tupa's career was thrown in an overtime loss in the 2002 season-opener against the New Orleans Saints during a punt attempt from the Buccaneers' five-yard line. Pressure from a Saints defender forced Tupa to abort the punt attempt and throw a desperation pass with his non-throwing arm which was intercepted by a Saints defender and returned for a touchdown, ending the game.

Tupa announced his retirement from football in the spring of 2006. In February 2006, he was appointed as the recreation director of Brecksville, Ohio.

References

External links

1966 births
Living people
All-American college football players
American Conference Pro Bowl players
American football punters
American football quarterbacks
Cleveland Browns players
Indianapolis Colts players
New England Patriots players
New York Jets players
Ohio State Buckeyes football players
Phoenix Cardinals players
Players of American football from Cleveland
Tampa Bay Buccaneers players
Washington Redskins players
People from Brecksville, Ohio